Kariman Abuljadayel (born 11 May 1994) is a Saudi Arabian sprinter. She competed in the women's 100 metres event at the 2016 Summer Olympics. She was the first woman from Saudi Arabia to compete in the event. She was eliminated from the Olympics after finishing seventh in a preliminary heat in 14.61 seconds.

References

External links
 

1994 births
Living people
Saudi Arabian female sprinters
Athletes (track and field) at the 2016 Summer Olympics
Olympic athletes of Saudi Arabia
Olympic female sprinters